Chloe Ferry (born Chloe West Etherington; 31 August 1995) is an English television personality from Newcastle, known for being a cast member in the  MTV reality series Geordie Shore. She also took part in the nineteenth series of Celebrity Big Brother in 2017.

Career

On 30 June 2015, Ferry appeared in an episode of Sun, Sex and Suspicious Parents where her family followed her to Sunny Beach, Bulgaria. On 17 February 2015, it was announced that Ferry had joined the cast of Geordie Shore making her debut in the tenth series. On 13 January 2017, Ferry entered the Celebrity Big Brother house taking part in the nineteenth series. She was evicted a week later. Ferry also appeared in the second series of Super Shore in 2016 for one episode with another Geordie Shore cast member, Kyle Christie.

Personal life
Ferry was in a relationship with Geordie Shore co-star Sam Gowland from 2017 to 2019. In July 2020, Ferry announced that she is bisexual.

Filmography

 Guest appearances
Sun, Sex and Suspicious Parents (30 June 2015)
Super Shore (27 November 2016)
Sex Pod (2 March 2017)
Release the Hounds (16 March 2017)
Your Face or Mine? (June 2017)
Celebs Go Dating (August 2019)

References

External links
 

1995 births
Bisexual women
Big Brother (British TV series) contestants
Celebrity Big Brother
Geordie Shore
Living people
People from Newcastle upon Tyne